Asteromassaria is a genus of fungi in the family Pleomassariaceae.

References

Pleosporales
Taxa named by Franz Xaver Rudolf von Höhnel